Asangwa is a town in North Kivu in northeastern Democratic Republic of the Congo. It lies on the Lindi River.

External links
Maplandia World Gazetteer

Populated places in North Kivu